FC Shakhtyor Artyom was a Russian football team from Artyom. It played professionally from 1991 to 1993. Their best result was 6th place in Zone 7 of the Russian Second Division in 1993.

External links
  Team history at KLISF

Association football clubs established in 1991
Association football clubs disestablished in 1994
Defunct football clubs in Russia
Sport in Primorsky Krai
1991 establishments in Russia
1994 disestablishments in Russia